The Christian cross, seen as a representation of the crucifixion of Jesus on a large wooden cross, is a renowned symbol of Christianity. It is related to the crucifix (a cross that includes a corpus, usually a three-dimensional with representation of Jesus' body) and to the more general family of cross symbols, the term cross itself being detached from the original specifically Christian meaning in modern English (as in many other western languages).

The basic forms of the cross are the Latin cross with unequal arms and the Greek cross with equal arms, besides numerous variants, partly with confessional significance, such as the tau cross, the double-barred cross, triple-barred cross, cross-and-crosslets, and many heraldic variants, such as the cross potent, cross pattée, cross moline, cross fleury, etc.

For a few centuries, the emblem of Christ was a headless T-shaped Tau cross rather than a Latin cross. Elworthy considered this to originate from Pagan Druids who made Tau crosses of oak trees stripped of their branches, with two large limbs fastened at the top to represent a man's arm; this was Thau, or god.

Pre-Christian symbolism
A version of the cross symbol was used long before the Christian era in the form of the ancient Egyptian ankh.

Instrument of Jesus' execution

John Pearson, Bishop of Chester wrote in his commentary on the Apostles' Creed that the Greek word  originally signified "a straight standing Stake, Pale, or Palisador", but that, "when other transverse or prominent parts were added in a perfect Cross, it retained still the Original Name", and he declared: "The Form then of the Cross on which our Saviour suffered was not a simple, but a compounded, Figure, according to the Custom of the Romans, by whose Procurator he was condemned to die. In which there was not only a straight and erected piece of Wood fixed in the Earth, but also a transverse Beam fastened unto that towards the top thereof".

Early Christian usage

There are few extant examples of the cross in 2nd century Christian iconography. It has been argued that Christians were reluctant to use it as it depicts a purposely painful and gruesome method of public execution. The extensive adoption of the cross as a Christian iconographic symbol arose from the 4th century.

However, the cross symbol was already associated with Christians in the 2nd century, as is indicated in the anti-Christian arguments cited in the Octavius of Minucius Felix, chapters IX and XXIX, written at the end of that century or the beginning of the next, and by the fact that by the early 3rd century the cross had become so closely associated with Christ that Clement of Alexandria, who died between 211 and 216, could without fear of ambiguity use the phrase  (the Lord's sign) to mean the cross, when he repeated the idea, current as early as the apocryphal Epistle of Barnabas, that the number 318 (in Greek numerals, ΤΙΗ) in Genesis 14:14 was interpreted as a foreshadowing (a "type") of the cross (T, an upright with crossbar, standing for 300) and of Jesus (ΙΗ, the first two letters of his name , standing for 18). His contemporary Tertullian rejected the accusation of Christians being "adorers of the gibbet". In his book , written in 204, Tertullian tells how it was already a tradition for Christians to trace repeatedly on their foreheads the sign of the cross. The crucifix, a cross upon which an image of Christ is present, is not known to have been used until the 6th century AD.

The oldest extant depiction of the execution of Jesus in any medium seems to be the second-century or early third-century relief on a jasper gemstone meant for use as an amulet, which is now in the British Museum in London. It portrays a naked bearded man whose arms are tied at the wrists by short strips to the transom of a T-shaped cross. An inscription in Greek on the obverse contains an invocation of the redeeming crucified Christ. On the reverse a later inscription by a different hand combines magical formulae with Christian terms. The catalogue of a 2007 exhibition says: "The appearance of the Crucifixion on a gem of such an early date suggests that pictures of the subject (now lost) may have been widespread even in the late second or early third century, most likely in conventional Christian contexts".

The Jewish Encyclopedia says:

In contemporary Christianity

 

In Christianity, communicants of the Oriental Orthodox and Eastern Orthodox Churches are expected to wear a cross necklace at all times; these are ordinarily given to believers at their baptism.

Many Christians, such as those in the tradition of the Church of the East, continue the practice of hanging a Christian cross in their homes, often on the east wall. Crosses or crucifixes are often the centre of a Christian family's home altar as well.

Catholics, Orthodox Catholic, Oriental Orthodox, members of the major branches of Christianity with other adherents as Lutheranism and Anglicans, and others often make the Sign of the Cross upon themselves. This was already a common Christian practice in the time of Tertullian.

The Feast of the Cross is an important Christian feast. One of the twelve Great Feasts in Orthodox Catholic is the Exaltation of the Cross on September 14, which commemorates the consecration of the basilica on the site where the original cross of Jesus was reportedly discovered in 326 by Helena of Constantinople, mother of Constantine the Great. The Catholic Church celebrates the feast on the same day and under the same name, though in English it has been called the feast of the Triumph of the Cross.

Roman Catholic, Eastern Orthodox, Lutheran and Anglican bishops place a cross (+) before their name when signing a document. The dagger symbol (†) placed after the name of a dead person (often with the date of death) is sometimes taken to be a Christian cross.

In many Christian traditions, such as the Methodist Churches, the altar cross sits atop or is suspended above the altar table and is a focal point of the chancel.

In many Baptist churches, a large cross hangs above the baptistry.

Rejection among various religious groups 

Although Christians accepted that the cross was the gallows on which Jesus died, they had already begun in the 2nd century to use it as a Christian symbol. During the first three centuries of the Christian era the cross was "a symbol of minor importance" when compared to the prominence given to it later, but by the second century it was closely associated with Christians, to the point where Christians were mocked as "adorers of the gibbet", an accusation countered by Tertullian. and it was already a tradition for Christians to trace repeatedly on their foreheads the sign of the cross. Martin Luther at the time of the Reformation retained the cross and crucifix in the Lutheran Church, which remains an important feature of Lutheran devotion and worship today. Luther wrote: , "The cross alone is our theology."

On the other hand, the Great Iconoclasm was a wave of rejecting sacred images among Calvinists of the 16th century. Some localities (such as England) included polemics against using the cross in worship. For example, during the 16th century, theologians in the Anglican and Reformed traditions Nicholas Ridley, James Calfhill, and Theodore Beza, rejected practices that they described as cross worship. Considering it a form of idolatry, there was a dispute in 16th century England over the baptismal use of the sign of the cross and even the public use of crosses. There were more active reactions to religious items that were thought as 'relics of Papacy', as happened for example in September 1641, when Sir Robert Harley pulled down and destroyed the cross at Wigmore. Writers during the 19th century indicating a Pagan origin of the cross included Henry Dana Ward, Mourant Brock, and John Denham Parsons. David Williams, writing of medieval images of monsters, says: "The disembodied phallus is also formed into a cross, which, before it became for Christianity the symbol of salvation, was a pagan symbol of fertility." The study, Gods, Heroes & Kings: The Battle for Mythic Britain states: "Before the fourth century CE, the cross was not widely embraced as a sign of Christianity, symbolizing as it did the gallows of a criminal." This reaction in the Anglican and other Reformed Churches was short-lived and the cross became ubiquitous in these Christian traditions.

Jehovah's Witnesses do not use the symbol of the cross in their worship, which they believe constitutes idolatry. They believe that Jesus died on a single upright torture stake rather than a two-beam cross, arguing that the Greek term  indicated a single upright pole. Although early Watch Tower Society publications associated with the Bible Student movement taught that Christ was executed on a cross, it no longer appeared on Watch Tower Society publications after the name Jehovah's  was adopted in 1931, and use of the cross was officially abandoned in 1936.

The Church of Jesus Christ of Latter-day Saints teaches that Jesus died on a cross; however, their prophet Gordon B. Hinckley stated that "for us the cross is the symbol of the dying Christ, while our message is a declaration of the living Christ." When asked what was the symbol of his religion, Hinckley replied "the lives of our people must become the only meaningful expression of our faith and, in fact, therefore, the symbol of our worship." Prophet Howard W. Hunter encouraged Latter-day Saints "to look to the temple of the Lord as the great symbol of your membership." Images of LDS temples and the Angel Moroni (who is found in statue on most temples) are commonly used to symbolize the faith of members of the Church of Jesus Christ of Latter Day Saints. In April 2020, under President Russell M. Nelson, the Church formally adopted an image inspired by Thorvaldsen's Christus statue underlain with the Church's name as an official symbol of the faith.

Notable individual crosses

See also

 Atrial cross
 Chi Rho
 Christian cross variants
 Cross burning
 Cross of All Nations
 Crosses in heraldry
 Ichthys
 IH Monogram
 IX Monogram
 Khachkar
 Nordic cross flag
 Roodmas
 Rood screen
 Rose Cross
 Scientology cross
 Russian Orthodox cross

Notes

References

 Philip Schaff, History of the Christian Church, ch. 6, "Christian Art: § 77. The Cross and the Crucifix" (1910 ed. [1858–1890])
William Wood Seymour, The Cross in Tradition, History and Art (1898).

External links
Encyclopaedia Britannica article Cross: religious symbol, with a clearer systematic presentation and chronology of Christian and pre-Christian use

 The Christian Cross of Jesus Christ, Symbols of Christianity, and representations of it as objects of devotion
 MSN Encarta( 2009-10-31), "Cross"
 An Explanation of the Russian Orthodox Three-Bar Cross
 Variations of Crosses - Images and Meanings

 
Cross
Cross symbols
Christian practices